The Imperial ruso or Imperial Russian is an Argentinian dessert from Buenos Aires. It is a French meringue cake stuffed with almonds and buttercream. Fruit can also be added to one's liking.

Origin 
In 1900, Cayetano Brenna, an Italian immigrant, had arrived in Argentina. In 1904, he acquired a shop in the corner between the Callao Avenue and the Rivadavia Avenue in the city of Buenos Aires. After having made the deal, he opened the Confitería del Molino in 1917.

Given the recent communist revolution in Russia and the subsequent execution of the Romanov monarchs, Brenna named the cake in their honor.

References 

Desserts
Meringue desserts
Culture in Buenos Aires